Daniel Wallace Culp (1852–1918) was a pastor, principal, doctor who authored a book about African Americans. He was the "first graduate of Biddle University".

He studied at Biddle Memorial Institute and then Princeton Theological Seminary.

His book features photographs and biographies of prominent African Americans as well as essays on various subjects related to African Americans in American society. His book featured profiles of prominent men and women. It was published by J. L. Nichols & Company.

Culp served as principal of Stanton Institute. He left to establish Florida Normal and Industrial Institute in Lake City, Florida. He subsequently led churches in Florence, Alabama and Nashville, Tennessee. He enrolled in the University of Michigan’s medical school and after studying there continued his medical education at Ohio Medical College. He was out in charge of the Freedmen’s Hospital in Augusta, Georgia but controversy ensued with white doctors protesting. He left and established his own medical practice before removing to Palatka, Florida and then Jacksonville, Florida with his wife and daughters.

Writings
 Twentieth Century Negro Literature; Or, A Cyclopedia of Thought on the Vital Topics Relating to the American Negro

See also
Monroe Work

References

1852 births
1918 deaths
African-American physicians
Physicians from Florida
Schoolteachers from Florida
African-American schoolteachers
Johnson C. Smith University alumni
19th-century American educators
Princeton Theological Seminary alumni
19th-century African-American educators
African-American Christian clergy
American school principals
Founders of schools in the United States
University of Michigan Medical School alumni
20th-century American male writers
20th-century African-American writers